Hu Xiansu or Hu Hsien-Hsu (24 May 1894 – 16 July 1968), was a Chinese botanist and an influential traditional scholar of his time. He was the founder of plant taxonomy in China and a pioneer of modern botany research and paleobotany in the country.

Education and career
Hu Xiansu studied preparatory course at Imperial University of Peking in 1909. In 1912 after the 1911 Revolution he went to America, and graduated from University of California, Berkeley in 1916. In 1918, he became a faculty member of National Nanking Higher Normal School and then National Southeastern University (later renamed National Central University and Nanking University). He went to America again in 1923 and received a doctor's degree from Harvard University in 1925. His wife died in Nanking in 1926, then he resigned from Department of Biology of Southeastern University and became a full-time research fellow at Institute of Biology of China Science Society. He co-founded Fan Memorial Institute of Biology in Peiping (Beijing) in 1928. He co-founded Lushan Botanical Garden in 1934 along with Ren-Chang Ching and Chen Fenghuai, he also founded the Yunnan Institute of Agriculture and Forest (later renamed Kunming Institute of Botany, Chinese Academy of Sciences) in 1938.

Along with his colleagues of the Science Society of China, Hu was a key leader of the first biological research institute in the country, and played an important role in founding the Botanical Society of China. He established the first plantation for botanical research at Mount Lu in Jiujiang, and initiated or conducted large-scale survey of flora of China.

Between 1940 and 1944, he was the founding president of the National Chung Cheng University (renamed National Nanchang University in 1949). In the 1940s, he played a key role, along with Wan Chun Cheng, in identifying the modern existence of the genus Metasequoia, an achievement widely regarded as "the greatest discovery of botany in 20th century", also co-naming the newly discovered species previously known only from fossils, in Sichuan, China.

In the 1950s, Lysenko's anti-Mendelian doctrines in genetics dominated biological science and agricultural practices in China. In such environment, Hu was openly critical to Lysenko’s doctrine, stating it as pseudoscience. For this Hu was publicly denounced, and the textbook he wrote containing material related was banned.  Later Hu was not elected as an Academician to the Chinese Academy of Sciences despite his numerous contributions, something attributed to his opposition to Lysenkoism.

Between 1950 and 1968, he served as a researcher at the Institute of Plant Taxonomy and the Institute of Botany, Chinese Academy of Sciences.

Later life and death 
In the midst of the Cultural Revolution (1966-1976), in May 1968 Hu was informed by his workplace that his salary "was suspended". His home was repeatedly ransacked and the books, calligraphy and paintings he had collected throughout his lifetime were confiscated by the workplace. Hu had to endure repeated struggle sessions, in which he was ordered to wear the Kuomintang flag to signify his past relation.  On July 15, he was notified to go to his workplace the next day to attend extended struggle sessions, the stress that the news caused on Hu was massive. On the early morning of July 16, 1968, Hu was found dead on his bed, having suffered a myocardial infarction.

Hu's funeral was commenced in the Babaoshan Revolutionary Cemetery on May 15, 1979. He was buried at Lushan Botanical Garden at Mount Lu on May 15, 1984.

See also
Science Society of China

Notes

References and further reading

External links

THE CHRONOLOGY OF THE “LIVING FOSSIL” METASEQUOIA GLYPTOSTROBOIDES  (TAXODIACEAE): A REVIEW (1943–2003)

20th-century Chinese botanists
Botanists active in China
Presidents of universities and colleges in China
Peking University alumni
University of California, Berkeley alumni
Harvard University alumni
Academic staff of the National Central University
Academic staff of Nanjing University
1894 births
1968 deaths
Members of Academia Sinica
Educators from Jiangxi
People from Nanchang
Academic staff of Peking University
Republic of China science writers
People's Republic of China science writers
Writers from Jiangxi
Biologists from Jiangxi